The 2011–12 Slovenian Hockey League was the 21st season of the Slovenian Ice Hockey League, the top level of ice hockey in Slovenia. Seven teams participated in the league, and HDD Olimpija have won the championship. HDD Olimpija and Jesenice received byes to the play-offs.

First round

Group A

Play-offs

Semi-finals
Jesenice – Triglav Kranj 6–0, 5–2
Olimpija  – Maribor 4–1, 3–3

Final
Olimpija – Jesenice 6–4, 2–3, 8–3, 5–2

3rd place
Triglav Kranj – Maribor 1–4, 1–4

External links
Final results
 

1
Slovenia
Slovenian Ice Hockey League seasons